Ibrány Sportegyesület is a professional football club based in Ibrány, Szabolcs-Szatmár-Bereg County, Hungary. The club competes in the Szabolcs-Szatmár-Bereg county league.

Name changes
?-1948: Ibrányi SE
1948–1950: Ibrányi EPOSz
1950–1951: Ibrányi DISz
1951–?: Ibrányi SK
?-?: Ibrányi TSZ
?-?: Ibrány Sportegyesület

External links
 Profile on Magyar Futball

References

Football clubs in Hungary
Association football clubs established in 1949
1949 establishments in Hungary